Carroll Park is a nearly  public park located in the historic Washington Village-Pigtown neighborhood in southwestern Baltimore, Maryland. The park is bordered by Washington Boulevard to the south, Monroe Street to the west, Bayard Street to the east, and the Mount Clare Branch of the Baltimore Terminal Subdivision railroad to the north. The park also extends westward beyond the Montgomery Ward Warehouse and Retail Store to include the Carroll Park Golf Course.

History
Acquired by the City of Baltimore in 1890, Carroll Park is Baltimore's third oldest urban park. The park's namesake comes from the historic Carroll family, who owned the property surrounding Mount Clare Mansion. After the Carrolls left Mount Clare in 1840, German immigrants leased the land for private use, using the name Schuetzen Park. Once under city ownership, the property was landscaped for public use by the Olmsted Brothers.

The Carroll Park Golf Course is notable for being one of the first golf courses racially integrated in 1951 due to civilian protests.

Carroll Park features the historic Mount Clare Museum House, a golf course, basketball courts, baseball fields, and a skate-park.

See also
Mount Clare, the Carroll mansion located in the center of the park.
Mount Clare Shops, railroad yards adjacent to the B&O Railroad Museum.

References

1890 establishments in Maryland
German-American culture in Baltimore
Parks in Baltimore
Pigtown, Baltimore